Aeshnoidea is a superfamily of dragonflies that contains five families, one of which is extinct.

Families

The superfamily includes the following five families:

 Petaluridae
 Aeshnidae
 Gomphidae
 Austropetaliidae
 Aktassiidae

See also

 Libelluloidea
 Cordulegastroidea

 
Dragonflies
Insect superfamilies